Borkel en Schaft is a former municipality in the Netherlands, consisting of the villages of Borkel and Schaft. It was a separate municipality until 1934. The area is now part of the municipality of Valkenswaard.
The spoken language is Kempenlands (an East Brabantian dialect, which is very similar to colloquial Dutch).

References 

Former municipalities of North Brabant
Valkenswaard